Loren Everett "Steve" Owens (born December 9, 1947) is an American former professional football player who was a running back in the National Football League (NFL) for five seasons in the early 1970s. Owens played college football for the University of Oklahoma, and was the 1969 Heisman Trophy winner and an All-American.  He was selected in the first round of the 1970 NFL Draft by the Detroit Lions, 19th overall, and became the first Lion to rush for over a 1,000 yards in a season.

Early years
Born in Gore, Oklahoma, Owens was raised in Miami, Oklahoma.  He attended Miami High School, where he was a standout high school football player for the Miami Wardogs. He is in the Miami Wardogs Hall of Fame. There is a sculpture of him by the Wardogs football field.

College career
Owens played college football for the University of Oklahoma in Norman from 1967 to 1969.  As a senior in 1969, he was recognized as a consensus first-team All-American, and became the second Oklahoma Sooner to win the Heisman Trophy (after Billy Vessels, and preceding Sam Bradford, Jason White, Billy Sims, Baker Mayfield and Kyler Murray).  He was the Sooners' all-time scorer with fifty-seven touchdowns until DeMarco Murray beat his record in 2010, and retains the third highest Sooners career rushing total with 4,041 yards.

Owens holds the distinction of executing touchdowns on the first three forward passes of his NCAA career.  He also established the career rushing record of 3,867 yards that stood for two years until Ed Marinaro broke it in 1971.  His 1967–1969 career points per game record would be broken the following season by Arkansas' Bill Burnett.

In 2006, the university erected a bronze statue of Owens on its campus in Heisman Park, commemorating his 1969 award.  He was also a member of the Kappa Sigma fraternity at OU.

Professional career
The Detroit Lions chose Owens in the first round (nineteenth overall) in the 1970 NFL draft, and he signed in June. He played for the Lions for five seasons, from 1970 to 1974, and struggled with injuries. In his rookie year, he had a severely separated shoulder that kept him out of the season's first half. Healthy, Owens rushed for 1,035 yards in 1971, becoming the first back in the history of the Lions' franchise to run for more than 1,000 yards in a single season, and was selected for the Pro Bowl.

On Thanksgiving in 1974 at Tiger Stadium, Owens opened the game with 46 yards in four carries but went down in the first quarter with ligament damage to his left knee. and sat out the entire 1975 season. He retired during training camp in August 1976, after a series of injuries that plagued his pro career.

Life after football
Owens served as the athletic director for the Oklahoma Sooners athletic program at his alma mater from August 1996 until March 1998.

See also
 List of NCAA Division I FBS players with at least 50 career rushing touchdowns
 List of NCAA major college football yearly scoring leaders

References

External links
 
 
 

1947 births
Living people
American football running backs
Detroit Lions players
Oklahoma Sooners athletic directors
Oklahoma Sooners football players
All-American college football players
College Football Hall of Fame inductees
Heisman Trophy winners
National Conference Pro Bowl players
People from Miami, Oklahoma
People from Gore, Oklahoma
Players of American football from Oklahoma